Saint Nikolai Cathedral ((Surb Nikolay Mayr yekeghets'i)) was a Russian Orthodox cathedral in Yerevan, Armenia. It was destroyed by Soviet forces in 1931. It was located at the site of what is now Shahumyan Square in Yerevan's Kentron District.

History
The Russian Orthodox Cathedral of St. Nikolai was located in the middle of the north-eastern side of the Cathedral Square (now Shaumyan Square) area. According to O. Khalpahkhyan, this Russian military cathedral at the central square of Yerevan, was built in the second half of the 19th century. The cathedral was built by local red and black tufa in the architectural forms that prevailed at that time in Russia.

The cathedral was destroyed in 1931, and later Shahumyan Square was built in its place.

Gallery

See also 
Russians in Armenia
History of Yerevan

References 

 ЦЕРКОВНОЕ СТРОИТЕЛЬСТВО В ЕРЕВАНЕ 19  НАЧАЛА 20 ВЕКОВ.
 Православие в Армении

19th-century Russian Orthodox church buildings
Buildings and structures in Yerevan
Cathedrals in Armenia
Churches in Yerevan
Eastern Orthodox church buildings in Armenia
Russian diaspora in Armenia
Russian Orthodox cathedrals in Asia
Destroyed churches
Demolished buildings and structures in Armenia